Dajana Cahill (born 4 August 1989) is an Australian actress, whose roles include the children's television series Mortified. Cahill has also appeared in a guest role on Australian soap Neighbours as Miranda Kelly, her first acting appearance in nine years.

Career 
Cahill was born in Brisbane. She resides in Brighton, Melbourne. She began her career at the Film and Television Studio International, studying screen acting on a part-time basis with her acting coach Craig McMahon. She continues to train at the Film and Television Studio International.

Cahill played the role of Layla Fry on children's television series Mortified, which aired on Nine Network, ABC1, the Disney Channel, and on the BBC in the UK. Layla annoys her sister Taylor (Marny Kennedy) in almost every episode. Cahill also appeared in the second series of Sea Patrol as Carly Walsman. She appeared in one episode of H2O: Just Add Water as a volleyball player on the opposite side of the main cast. In 2017, Cahill joined the Australian soap opera Neighbours in the guest role of Miranda Kelly.

Filmography

References

External links 
 

1989 births
Living people
Actresses from Brisbane
Australian television actresses